The 2000–01 Chicago Blackhawks season was the team's 75th season of operation. Finishing 12th in the Western Conference, they did not qualify for the 2001 Stanley Cup playoffs.

Off-season
Forward Tony Amonte was named captain.

Regular season

Final standings

Schedule and results

Player statistics

Regular season
Scoring

Goaltending

Awards and records

Transactions

Draft picks
Chicago's draft picks at the 2000 NHL Entry Draft held at the Pengrowth Saddledome in Calgary, Alberta.

See also
2000–01 NHL season

References

Chic
Chic
Chicago Blackhawks seasons
Chic
Chic